Carlos Cillóniz Oberti (1 July 1910 – 24 October 1972) was a Peruvian football forward. He was also Universitario de Deportes' ninth president.

Career 
His career in club football was spent in Universitario de Deportes. He played for the Peru national football team in the 1930 FIFA World Cup.

References

External links
 

1910 births
1972 deaths
People from Ica, Peru
Association football midfielders
Peruvian footballers
Peru international footballers
1930 FIFA World Cup players
Peruvian Primera División players
Club Universitario de Deportes footballers